E Marion Jones  (1944) is a New Zealand nursing academic. As of September 2018 she is a full professor at the Auckland University of Technology.

Academic career

After a 1993 Masters' titled  'Shaping nursing praxis: some registered nurses' perceptions and beliefs of theory practice'  from Massey University and a 2001 PhD titled  'Shaping team practice in the context of health reform opportunities, tensions, benefits'  at Flinders University of South Australia, Jones moved to the Auckland University of Technology, rising to full professor.

In 2015 Jones was honored by the New Zealand Nurses Organisation's, with NZNO president Marion Guy saying that "Jones' contribution to nursing, and in particular perioperative nursing both nationally and internationally was "exemplary".

Jones is an auditor for The Academic Quality Agency for New Zealand Universities (AQA).

Selected works 
 Reid, Duncan, Marion Jones, and Daniel O’Brien. "Building interprofessional leadership in a clinical setting." In Leadership and Collaboration, pp. 169–181. Palgrave Macmillan, London, 2015.
 Flood, Brenda, Daniel O’Brien, and Marion Jones. "Interprofessional health care team challenge: A New Zealand perspective." In Leading research and evaluation in interprofessional education and collaborative practice, pp. 267–283. Palgrave Macmillan, London, 2016.
 Jones, Marion, Antoinette McCallin, and Susan Shaw. "Reflections from New Zealand: Facilitating Cultural Change." In Leadership development for interprofessional education and collaborative practice, pp. 179–195. Palgrave Macmillan, London, 2014.

References

Living people
1944 births
New Zealand women academics
Flinders University alumni
Academic staff of the Auckland University of Technology
New Zealand nurses
New Zealand medical researchers
New Zealand women writers